Jessica Haak is a Democratic-NPL politician who served in the North Dakota House of Representatives, representing the 12th district from 2013 to 2017. While not serving in the legislature, Haak works for the North Dakota Farmers Union.

References

External links
 
Legislative page
Twitter account

Living people
Women state legislators in North Dakota
University of Jamestown alumni
People from Jamestown, North Dakota
21st-century American politicians
21st-century American women politicians
Year of birth missing (living people)
Democratic Party members of the North Dakota House of Representatives